Kalsbeek may refer to:

 Ella Kalsbeek (born 1955), Dutch politician
 Kalsbeek College, secondary school